Divco was a brand name of delivery trucks built and marketed in the United States. Divco is an acronym which stands for Detroit Industrial Vehicles COmpany. Divco became known for its multi-stop delivery trucks, particularly in use as home delivery vehicles by dairy producers. From 1926 until 1986, Divco produced trucks of various sizes and job descriptions.

History
The chief engineer of the Detroit Electric Vehicle Company, George Bacon, suggested using a gasoline engine for their line of delivery vehicles to overcome limits on their range and performance in cold weather. Because his bosses refused, Bacon left the company and with a group of investors, established the Detroit Industrial Vehicle Company in 1926.

The first Divco "Model A" were boxy, practical vehicles. High organizational costs meant the company went through a reorganization in 1927. In 1928, a larger, more conventional "Model G" was introduced that evolved into the "Model S" that was manufactured into the 1930s. During the Great Depression the company was bought out by Continental Motors Company, which supplied most of the engines installed in Divco trucks, and then spun off from Continental in 1936 to be acquired by Twin Coach, thus becoming "Divco-Twin."

A new design was introduced in 1937 featuring a welded all-steel van body and a snub-nosed hood, a model that was manufactured with almost no changes up to the end of the line in 1986. Along with the new "Model U", the company built a new production facility on the outskirts of Detroit.

With most Divco trucks, controls allowed driving while standing, including throttle and brake mounted on the steering column. The early models were not refrigerated, with perishable loads such as milk crates loaded and then covered with ice — making the trucks prone to rust from the inside out. The company  marketed to fleet buyers promoting their trucks as "a bigger value when you buy, produces more profit in your delivery operation, is worth more when you trade."

In 1957, Divco merged with the Wayne Works in Richmond, Indiana, to form Divco-Wayne. During the Divco-Wayne era, some Divco trucks were modified with seats and windows from the Wayne Works to produce a Divco Dividend Bus. Very few of these units were built between 1959 and 1961. The truck manufacturing of Divco-Wayne continued to be through the Divco portion. Divco was spun off from the company in 1968, and production was moved from Detroit to Delaware, Ohio, in 1969. Production ended in 1986.

Wayne continued manufacturing buses until bankruptcy and liquidation in 1992.

References

External links

 Divco Club of America
 Old Car and Truck Pictures - Divco

Defunct truck manufacturers of the United States
Defunct motor vehicle manufacturers of the United States
Vehicle manufacturing companies established in 1926
Vehicle manufacturing companies disestablished in 1986
1926 establishments in Michigan
1986 disestablishments in Ohio
Motor vehicle manufacturers based in Michigan
Defunct manufacturing companies based in Ohio